Kankan Bhattacharyya was a modern non-linear laser spectroscopy scientist. His main interest is in femtosecond dynamics in nano-confined systems that include biological assemblies. His primary discovery is the ultraslow nature of biological water.

He was the director and chair professor of Indian Association for the Cultivation of Science (IACS), Kolkata, the oldest centre for scientific research in Asia. He is a fellow of all of the national science academies of India and a senior editor of The Journal of Physical Chemistry. He has received awards from many countries; most notably, the Shanti Swarup Bhatnagar Award in Chemical Science from the (CSIR, India) in 1997 and the TWAS Prize in 2007.

He graduated from Presidency College under Calcutta University, and achieved his master's at Rajabazar Science College, Calcutta University. He did his doctoral research under the supervision of Professor Mihir Chowdhury, an eminent scientist in the field of molecular spectroscopy and photochemistry at IACS (1984).

Currently he is a visiting professor at Department of Chemistry, Indian Institute of Science Education and Research, Bhopal

References

External links 
Official Home Page on IACS

Academic staff of the Indian Institutes of Science Education and Research
20th-century Indian chemists
Living people
University of Calcutta alumni
Recipients of the Shanti Swarup Bhatnagar Award in Chemical Science
Year of birth missing (living people)
TWAS laureates
Scientists from West Bengal